Roger B. Hayden (1945-2019) was an American politician serving as a member of the Baltimore County Board of Education from 1974 to 1987 and again from 2017 until his death in 2019. A member of the Republican Party, he also served as the 8th Baltimore County Executive from 1990 to 1994.

During Hayden's term as county executive, he was controversial for various decisions made within the county, including the closing of nine of the then 24 branches of Baltimore County Public Library.

Career

As Baltimore County Executive
	Oversaw 610 square mile county with a population of 700,000 and  annual budget of $1.3 billion
	Guided county through a recession
	Cumulative reduction in State aid of $160,310,000 was handled without a service impact on operations
	Maintained AAA Bond Rating
	Reduced government spending from an annual average increase of 7.7% to 1.45%
	Right-sized government and reduced central government personnel by 14%
	Increased educational budget in both the operating and capital budgets
	Placed more policemen on the street than ever before by redirecting fiscal resources
	Structured and streamlined a new development process for residential and commercial builders making the county more business friendly
	Evaluated and approved numerous capital construction projects

Appointed by Governor Larry Hogan to the Baltimore County Board of Education 2017

Formerly
 Towson University Associate Vice President of Facilities 2009-2013
 Baltimore Orioles Director of Ballpark Operations 1996-2008
 President, American Lung Association of Maryland
 Board of Education of Baltimore County —1974 to 1986

References 

Maryland Republicans
Baltimore County Executives
School board members in Maryland
1945 births
2019 deaths